Gornik Knoll (‘Halm Gornik’ \'h&lm 'gor-nik\) is the rocky hill rising to 477 m on the southeast side of Cugnot Ice Piedmont on Trinity Peninsula in Graham Land, Antarctica.

The hill is named after the settlement of Gornik in Northern Bulgaria.

Location
German-British mapping in 1996.

Maps
 Trinity Peninsula. Scale 1:250000 topographic map No. 5697. Institut für Angewandte Geodäsie and British Antarctic Survey, 1996.
 Antarctic Digital Database (ADD). Scale 1:250000 topographic map of Antarctica. Scientific Committee on Antarctic Research (SCAR). Since 1993, regularly updated.

Notes

References
 Gornik Knoll. SCAR Composite Antarctic Gazetteer
 Bulgarian Antarctic Gazetteer. Antarctic Place-names Commission. (details in Bulgarian, basic data in English)

External links
 Gornik Knoll. Copernix satellite image

Hills of Trinity Peninsula
Bulgaria and the Antarctic